Ann Kipling L.L.D is a Canadian artist who creates impressionistic portraits and landscapes on paper from direct observation.  Kipling's distinctive style of overlapping, temporally suggestive linework is formed through her working process, which involves drawing her subject over time, recording subtle shifts in movement in the sitter or landscape during that period. Her work is characterized by a flat sense of space, where lines are used to frame a vibrating and gestural idea of her subject, rather than a direct representation of form. While not directly connected to any art movement in particular, connections can be made to Chinese landscape painters and the watercolours of Paul Cézanne. Using colour minimally, her primary media is etching, drawing, watercolours, pen, pencil, pastels and pencil crayons. She lives and works in Falkland, BC, a location which serves as a focus for her recent landscapes.

Early life and education
From 1955 to 1960 Kipling studied at the Vancouver School of Art (now Emily Carr University of Art and Design). She studied with Jan Zack, Herbert Siebner, and Rudy Kovak before gaining her footing as an artist in the 1960s-70s, most notably with her first solo show at the Vancouver Art Gallery in 1971. In the 1960s she moved to the Lynn Valley where she lived and worked for a number of years. During this period her interest in depictions of natural phenomenon grew, and she began developing her individual style which involved working in extended sessions for her plein air landscapes and sittings with models for portraiture.

Later work
Kipling has described her practice as follows, "When I am drawing from the figure or the landscape, I am fascinated by the change, movement, energy and transformation of form in a seemingly static situation" (Ann Kipling, 2003, For the Record, Drawing Contemporary Life). She has shown regularly in group and solo shows in Canada from the 1970s to the present day. In 2009 she made 141 drawings, mostly of the mountains around Falkland, BC, which were the focus of her 2011 exhibition at the Burnaby Art Gallery (Burnaby, BC), The Solitudes of Place: Recent Drawings by Ann Kipling. Her common tools of the trade are a drawing board, graphite, coloured pencils, pens and BFK Rives paper. Her works are commonly titled based on the day they are made, rather than the location, creating a sense of chronological unfolding or journaling in her oeuvre. She has works in the permanent collection of the National Gallery of Canada, The Burnaby Art Gallery and in private and public collections across the nation. In 2004 she was the recipient of the Audain Prize (named after Michael Audain). In 2017 her work was included in the exhibition, The Ornament of a House: Fifty Years of Collecting at the Burnaby Art Gallery

Personal life
In 1961 Kipling married German-Canadian sculptor Leonhard Epp (1932-2018). She has lived in Sunshine Falls, BC and Falkland, BC. She is a dedicated Tai Chi and yoga practitioner.

Selected solo exhibitions
Kipling has had many solo exhibitions, among them the following:
2014 Ann Kipling: The Falkland Drawings: a thirty-five-year survey, Kelowna Art Gallery (Kelowna, BC)
2011 The Solitudes of Place: Recent Drawings by Ann Kipling, Burnaby Art Gallery, Burnaby, BC 
2000 Ann Kipling: Prints (traveling show), Kamloops Art Gallery, Kamloops, BC
Ann Kipling: Prints & Drawings, Vernon Art Gallery, Vernon, BC
Ann Kipling: Prints, 1958–67 (travelling show), Kamloops Art Gallery, Kamloops, BC
1995 Ann Kipling (travelling show), Vancouver Art Gallery, Vancouver
1991 Three Decades: Ann Kipling, Vernon Art Gallery, Vernon, BC
1987 Ann Kipling (show of portraits), Art Gallery of Greater Victoria, Victoria, BC, toured to Vancouver Art Gallery and the Kelowna Art Gallery
1982 Ann Kipling: Prints (travelling show), Art Gallery of Greater Victoria, Victoria, BC
1980 Ann Kipling: Recent Landscapes (travelling show), Art Gallery of Greater Victoria, Victoria, BC
1976 Ann Kipling (travelling show), Vancouver Art Gallery, BC
1971 Drawings by Ann Kipling (travelling show), Vancouver Art Gallery, Vancouver

Awards
2008 Honorary Doctorate, Emily Carr University, Vancouver
2004 Audain Prize for Lifetime Achievement in the Visual Arts
 numerous Canada Council Grants, including the Victor Martyn Lynch-Staunton Award in 1987
1993 Project Assistance for Visual Arts, BC Cultural Services grant
1960 and 1964 Koerner Foundation grant
Emily Carr Scholarship
Vancouver School of Art Travel Scholarship

Sources
Oakes, Julie. Ann Kipling – Headspace. Vernon: Rich Fog Micro Publishing. 2014. 
Laurence, Robin, Darrin J. Martens, and Rosemarie L. Tovell. The Solitudes of Place: Recent Drawings by Ann Kipling. Canada: Hemlock Printers. 2011 
Macdonald, Colin S. A Dictionary of Canadian Artists. Ottawa: Canadian Paperbacks. 1975. Vol 3, p. 647.

External links
  Douglas Udell Gallery

References

1934 births
Living people
Artists from Victoria, British Columbia
Emily Carr University of Art and Design alumni
20th-century Canadian women artists
21st-century Canadian women artists